This is a list of active and extinct volcanoes in Italy.

See also
Volcanology of Italy
List of mountains of Italy

Notes

References
 Global Volcanism Program

Italy
 
Volcanoes